Gnorimoschema jocelynae is a moth in the family Gelechiidae. It was described by William E. Miller in 2000. It is found in North America, where it has been recorded from Alberta, the District of Columbia, Iowa, Kentucky, Missouri, Ontario and Quebec.

The larvae feed on Solidago gigantea.

References

Gnorimoschema
Moths described in 2000